Bengt Johansson (25 June 1942 – 8 May 2022) was a Swedish handball player and coach. He was born in Halmstad in south-west Sweden and played in the Sweden men's national handball team between 1964 and 1972. He is better known as being the coach for the Swedish team from 1988 to 2004.

His nickname was Bengan, a common nickname in Sweden for people named Bengt. He was recognisable by his Halmstad dialect way of speaking. He invented a special tactic known as Gurkburken ("The Gherkin Jar"), which he pronounced with his distinguished dialect.

During his time as a coach the Swedish national team (occasionally known as the Bengan Boys), won several international championships, including two World Championships (1990 and 1999), four European Championships (1994, 1998, 2000 and 2002) and three silver medals at the Olympic Games (1992, 1996 and 2000).

He was succeeded as national coach by Ingemar Linnéll.

Johansson died on 8 May 2022, at the age of 79. He suffered from Parkinson's disease.

References

External links

1942 births
2022 deaths
Swedish male handball players
Olympic handball players of Sweden
Handball players at the 1972 Summer Olympics
Handball coaches of international teams
Sportspeople from Halmstad
HK Drott players
Sportspeople from Halland County